Alcis is a genus of moths in the family Geometridae described by John Curtis in 1826.

Species

Alcis aagostigma (Prout, 1927)
Alcis admissaria Guenée, 1858
Alcis albilinea Sato, 1993 (India)
Alcis angulifera (Butler, 1878)
Alcis anmashanensis Sato, 1999
Alcis arizana Wileman, 1911
Alcis bachmaensis Sato, 2008
Alcis bastelbergeri (Hirschke, 1908)
Alcis bornemaculata Sato, 2005
Alcis caucasica (Wehrli, 1928)
Alcis chiangmaiensis Sato, 1991
Alcis cockaynei (Prout, 1916)
Alcis colorifera (Prout, 1916)
Alcis convariata (Prout, 1935) (Java)
Alcis decussata Moore, 1867
Alcis depravata (Staudinger, 1892)
Alcis ectogramma (Wehrli, 1934)
Alcis eupithecioides (West, 1929)
Alcis extinctaria (Eversmann, 1851)
Alcis granitaria (Moore, 1888)
Alcis hemiphanes (Prout, 1925)
Alcis herbuloti Orhant, 2000
Alcis hodeberti Herbulot, 1987
Alcis hyberniata Bastelberger, 1909
Alcis imbecilis (Moore, 1888)
Alcis jubata (Thunberg, 1788) – dotted carpet
Alcis leucophaea D. S. Fletcher, 1961
Alcis lobbichleri D. S. Fletcher, 1961
Alcis lutzi Sato, 2008
Alcis macroclarata Sato, 1993
Alcis maculata (Moore, [1868])
Alcis manfredi Sato, 2005
Alcis medialbifera Inoue, 1972
Alcis micromaculata Sato, 2005
Alcis moesta (Butler, 1881)
Alcis nigridorsaria (Guenée, 1857)
Alcis nigrifasciata (Warren, 1893)
Alcis nigrolineata (Wileman & South, 1917)
Alcis nilgirica Hampson, 1895
Alcis nobilitaria (Staudinger, 1892)
Alcis nubeculosa (Bastelberger, 1909)
Alcis paghmana Wiltshire, 1967
Alcis pallens Inoue, 1978
Alcis pammicra (L. B. Prout, 1925)
Alcis paraclarata Sato, 1993
Alcis paukstadti Sato, 2008
Alcis periphracta (Prout, 1926)
Alcis picata (Butler, 1881)
Alcis plebeia Wileman, 1912
Alcis polysticta (Hampson, 1902)
Alcis postlurida Inoue, 1978
Alcis praevariegata (Prout, 1926)
Alcis pryeraria (Leech, 1897)
Alcis repandata (Linnaeus, 1758) – mottled beauty
Alcis rubicunda Bastelberger, 1909
Alcis scortea (Bastelberger, 1909)
Alcis semialba (Moore, 1888)
Alcis semiatrata Sato, 2008
Alcis semiclarata Walker, 1862
Alcis semiochrea Prout, 1917
Alcis semiopaca Sato & M. Wang, 2008
Alcis semipullata (Prout, 1925)
Alcis semiusta (Bastelberger, 1909)
Alcis shivae Wiltshire, 1967
Alcis songarica (Alphéraky, 1883)
Alcis subochrearia (Leech, 1897) (western China)
Alcis subpunctata Wileman, 1911
Alcis subrepandata Staudinger, 1897
Alcis subtincta Warren, 1897
Alcis taiwanensis Inoue, 1978
Alcis taiwanovariegata (Wileman & South, 1917)
Alcis tayulina Sato, 1990
Alcis tricotaria (Felder, 1867)
Alcis variegata (Moore, 1888)
Alcis xuei Sato & M. Wang, 2005

References
 
 , 2000, Bulletin de la Société Entomologique de Mulhouse 56: 1–9.
 , 1991: Records of the Genera Hypomecis, Cleora and Alcis (Geometridae; Ennominae) from Thailand, with Descriptions of Three New Species and One New Subspecies. Tyô to Ga 42 (4): 271–288. Full article: .
 , 1995: Records of the Boarmiini (Geometridae: Ennominae) from Thailand II. Trans. lepid. Soc. Japan 46 (4): 209–227. Full article: .
 , 1996: Records of the Boarmiini (Geometridae; Ennominae) from Thailand III. Transactions of the Lepidopterological Society of Japan 47(4): 223–236. Full article: .
 , 2002: Two new species and two new subspecies of the Boarmiini from Taiwan, with notes on Alcis anmashanensis Sato (Geometridae: Ennominae). Trans. lepid. Soc. Japan 53 (3): 141–149.
 , 2005: Notes on Alcis pammicra (Prout), A. maculata (Moore) (Geometridae: Ennominae) and their allies from Southeast Asia, with descriptions of three new species. Trans. lepid. Soc. Japan 56 (1): 19–30. full article: 
 , 2008, Notes on Alcis variegata (Moore), A. colorifera (Prout) (Geometridae: Ennominae), and their allies from the Sundan Islands, with descriptions of two new species, Transactions of the Lepiodopterological Society of Japan 59 (2): 171-185
 , 2008, Notes on Alcis semialba (Moore) (Geometridae: Ennominae) and its allies from Southeast Asia, with descriptions of three new species, Tinea 20 (4): 201–208.

Boarmiini
Geometridae genera
Taxa named by John Curtis